World Xtreme Wrestling (WXW) is a Florida-based independent professional wrestling promotion which has held events across the United States and toured in Japan, the Middle East and South Pacific region including American Samoa and Guam.

The promotion is associated with Afa Anoa'i's Wild Samoan Pro Wrestling Training Center in Minneola, Florida, and students who have competed for the promotion include Batista, Chris Kanyon, Billy Kidman, Gene Snitsky and cousins Jamal (known as Umaga) and Rosey of Three Minute Warning. Court Bauer, a member of the WWE creative team, was formerly a booker for the promotion during the mid-1990s.

The promotion features in the film The Wrestler, where Mickey Rourke's character "Randy 'The Ram' Robinson" wrestles Tommy Rotten (portrayed by WXW wrestler Tommy Suede).

History

Trans World Wrestling Federation
Originally formed in 1970 as the Trans World Wrestling Federation in association with the original Wild Samoan Pro Wrestling Training Center, the promotion's early history is unrecorded. However, Jules Strongbow and Yukon Jack have both been credited as former heavyweight champions. During the early 1990s, the promotion's roster included independent wrestlers such as Bam Bam Bigelow, Chief Dave Foxx, Billy Kidman, Chris Kanyon, Tony Stetson and Glen Osbourne.

World Xtreme Wrestling
World Xtreme Wrestling was established in 1996 as a continuation of the Trans World Wrestling Federation and continued to be owned and operated by Afa Anoa'i. In 1998, the promotion held its first live televised supercard Sportsfest '98 in Allentown, Pennsylvania which featured several wrestlers from the World Wrestling Federation including Rocky Maivia, Mankind, Owen Hart, D'Lo Brown as well as former WWF wrestlers Doink the Clown, King Kong Bundy and The Bushwhackers.

Shortly after the close of Extreme Championship Wrestling (ECW), several former ECW wrestlers including Mikey Whipwreck, Devon Storm, Little Guido, The Sandman and Tommy Dreamer "invaded" Sportsfest 2001. In the main event, The Sandman and Tommy Dreamer were defeated by Samu and Mana.

During that year, the promotion established a women's division with Kattra becoming the first WXW Women's Champion. She eventually was stripped of the title in March 2001 after failing to defend the championship. Although BellaDonna won the title after defeating Jessica Dally on March 9, the title was again vacated. The title remained inactive for several months, but the division was reactivated following the WXW Women's ELITE 8 Tournament in Danbury, Connecticut on September 25, 2002 with Cindy Rogers winning the WXW Women's title in a battle royal at Sportsfest 2003.

Although the promotion had held live television tapings at past events, WXW began airing a weekly television program, WXW Rage TV in January 2002 featuring a variety of WXW talent, including Afa, Afa Jr., L.A. Smooth, Showtime Shane Black, Havoc, Nuissance, Supreme Lee Great, and Samu. Rage TV features a rotating commentary team that has included Doc Daniels, The Bald Guy, Ben Miller, Saul Steinberk, Gerry Strauss and Nate Stein. Other independent wrestlers who have appeared on Rage TV include Salvatore Bellomo, Low Ki, John Rambo and Slyk Wagner Brown.

In early 2002, WXW promoted its first tour overseas and appeared for U.S. troops stationed in the Middle East, including Afghanistan. In August 2002, the promotion held a second tour in Asia and the South Pacific appearing for one month in Japan, Okinawa, Korea, Guam and Hawaii.

In late 2004, WXW expanded and began holding events in Florida near the original Wild Samoan Pro Wrestling Training Center in Pensacola. WXW began holding all of its events in Minneola, Florida, and broadcasting Rage TV on their website. A new branch of WXW, called WXW C4 was created and promotes regular events in Allentown, Pennsylvania. WXW C4 is run by Samu and Afa Jr. and has a weekly television show, Blast TV.

Women's ELITE 8 Tournament
The Women's Elite 8 Tournament is a tournament formed to offer a platform for top female wrestlers. There have been eight annual tournaments starting September 27, 2002 in Danbury, Connecticut. The last tournament was held in 2009.

2002
September 27, 2002 in Danbury, Connecticut

2003
November 21, 2003 in Sciota, Pennsylvania

2004
October 9, 2004 in Sciota, Pennsylvania

2005
October 23, 2005 in Allentown, Pennsylvania

2006
October 14, 2006 in Allentown, Pennsylvania

2007
November 10, 2007 in Coplay, Pennsylvania with Sunny as the special guest referee for the finals

2008
November 15, 2008 in Leesburg, Florida

2009
November 14, 2009 in Minneola, Florida

Championships

Active championships

Former championships

WXW Hall of Fame
There are currently 28 inductees in the hall of fame, from 2013-2016.

Inductees

See also
List of independent wrestling promotions in the United States
Gary Albright Memorial Show
Yokozuna Memorial Show

References

Further reading
"Wrestler Has Attack In Ring, Dies; Pro Wrestler Gary Albright Suffers A Heart Attack In Match With Bill Owen Of Wilkes-Barre During World Xtreme Wrestling Show In Hazleton".  Wilkes-Barre Times Leader.  09 Jan 2000
"Pro wrestler dies in the ring".  Associated Press.  10 Jan 2000
"Red Lake Falls' Tag Team - Hometown Boys Pin Hope On Pro Wrestling".  Grand Forks Herald.  22 Sept 2002
Duncan, Royal and Gary Will. Wrestling Title Histories, Revised 4th Edition. Waterloo, Ontario: Archeus Communications, 2000.

External links

 
Sports organizations established in 1996
American independent professional wrestling promotions based in Pennsylvania